Powell River Airport  is located adjacent to Powell River, British Columbia, Canada. In 2011, the airport had approximately 39,422 passenger departures and arrivals.

Airlines and destinations

References

External links

Certified airports in British Columbia
Powell River, British Columbia